Longridge Golf Club, in Longridge, England, was founded around 1915, making it one of the oldest golf clubs in the county of Lancashire. It is a par 70, 5,904-yard course.

Course
The course became eighteen holes, from its original nine, in 1971. Four of these holes (1, 2, 17 and 18) are located on the southern side of Forty Acre Lane and run north–south or south–north; the other fourteen, on the northern side of the road, follow the ridge of the fell, allowing for largely 180-degree views of not only the immediate West Lancashire area (most prominently the Vale of Chipping) but also into the Yorkshire Dales to the northeast.

History
Preston Cycling Club, who were looking for a new home, merged with the already established golf club on 17 March 1917. It was known as Preston Cycling Club and Longridge Golf Club until the 1960s, and the golf club's logo still references this connection.

Gallery

References

External links 

Score card and hole layout - SkyGolf
Longridge Golf Club – Visit Lancashire

Golf clubs and courses in Lancashire
Longridge
1915 establishments in England